Pavel Nikolayevich Gusev (born 4 April 1949, Moscow) is a Russian journalist and public figure. He has been the editor-in-chief of the Moscow daily newspaper Moskovskij Komsomolets since 1983. He is a professor of journalism at the International University in Moscow and a member of Russia's Presidential Council for Civil Society and Human Rights.

He is also the head of the Moscow Union of Journalists.

Early life and education
Gusev was born on 4 April 1949 in Moscow, Russia.

He graduated from the Russian State Geological Prospecting University in 1971. From 1971-1975, Gusev was a junior research associate at the Russian State Geological Prospecting University. Then he earned a graduate degree in literature from Maxim Gorky Literature Institute in 1985.

Career
Gusev was involved in the Communist youth organization Komsomol from 1975 right up till 1983. He served as Second Secretary of Komsomol's Krasnopresnensky District branch in Moscow from 1975 till 1976, then First Secretary from 1976 till 1980. He worked in the international department of the Komsomol's Central Committee until 1983, when he joined Moskovskij Komsomolets in his present role as editor-in-chief.

In 1991, Pavel Gusev stated that “... editors-in-chief and leaders of the press will always be selected for political or administrative reasons”.

Viktor Shenderovich wrote about Pavel Gusev that his evolution was from a member of Komsomol to Gorbachev’s perestrojka wave and to a democrat-supporter of Yeltsin, then to a patriot from the Congress of Russian communities, a loyal supporter of the Moscow mayor Luzhkov and, finally, an obedient servant of Putin.

Gusev is currently a member of Russia's Presidential Council for Civil Society and Human Rights, where he is chairman of the "Commission on Supporting Mass Media as the Basis of Civil Society".

In May 2016, he was included in the sanctions list of Ukraine by President Petro Poroshenko, he was denied entry to Ukraine.

In 2018, Pavel Gusev was Vladimir Putin's confidant in the presidential elections in Russia.

In April 2022, in response to the Russian invasion of Ukraine, Gusev was added to the European Union sanctions list "in response to the ongoing unjustified and unprovoked Russian military aggression against Ukraine and other actions undermining or threatening the territorial integrity, sovereignty and independence of Ukraine".

Awards
 Laureate of the Russian public award  The Best Feathers of Russia  in 1999.
 Order of Honour in 2009.
  For Service to Moscow  distinction in 2003.

References

External links
 Передача «Фотоальбом с Павлом Гусевым» на канале «Кто есть кто»

1949 births
Journalists from Moscow
Recipients of the Order of Honour (Russia)
Soviet journalists
Russian male journalists
Russian media executives
Russian newspaper people
Members of the Civic Chamber of the Russian Federation
Living people
Russian newspaper editors
Russian individuals subject to European Union sanctions